The 2nd Medical Battalion (2D MED BN) is a medical support unit of the United States Marine Corps and that is headquartered at Marine Corps Base Camp Lejeune, North Carolina.  The unit falls under the 2nd Marine Logistics Group (2nd MLG).

Current units
 Headquarters and Service Company (HSC)
 Alpha Surgical Company (A Company)
 Bravo Surgical Company (B Company)
 Charlie Surgical Company (C Company)

Mission
Provide medical support to II MEF during combat operations.  Prepared to deploy on short notice into any environment.

See also

 History of the United States Marine Corps
 List of United States Marine Corps battalions
 Organization of the United States Marine Corps

External links
 2nd Medical Battalion official website

Med 2